John Ainslie Johnston (17 November 1902 – 12 October 1987) was a Scottish footballer who played as a centre-half for Heart of Midlothian, where he spent 14 years (as well as half-season loans at Stevenston United and Cowdenbeath and a short spell with Arbroath before retiring), and the Scotland national team.

See also
List of Scotland national football team captains

References

Sources

External links

1902 births
1987 deaths
Scottish footballers
Footballers from North Ayrshire
Association football central defenders
Scotland international footballers
Heart of Midlothian F.C. players
Cowdenbeath F.C. players
Ardeer Thistle F.C. players
Arbroath F.C. players
Scottish Junior Football Association players
Scottish Football League players
Scottish Football League representative players
People from Stevenston